Edmonton-Highlands-Norwood is a provincial electoral district for the Legislative Assembly of Alberta, Canada. The district was created in 2004 when it was merged with Edmonton-Highlands and Edmonton-Norwood.

This inner-city northeast Edmonton riding has the second lowest average income in Alberta, as well as being one of the most ethnically diverse. This riding and its predecessor ridings have voted NDP in six of the last seven elections.

Neighborhoods in this riding include: Highlands, Bellevue, Montrose, Newton, Virginia Park, Cromdale, Parkdale, Alberta Avenue, Boyle Street, McCauley, Eastwood & Riverdale.

The riding is currently held by the Alberta NDP's Janis Irwin.

History
The electoral district was created in the 2003 boundary redistribution after the electoral districts of Edmonton-Highlands and Edmonton-Norwood were merged.

The 2010 boundary redistribution saw significant boundary changes as all land west of 50 street was ceded to Edmonton-Beverly-Clareview. A portion of the west boundary that moved along 97 Street between 105 and 111 Avenue was pushed west to 104 Street that was formerly part of Edmonton-Centre and minor alterations were made with the north border of Edmonton-Decore.

Boundary history

Representation history

The electoral district was created in the 2004 boundary redistribution by combining the old Edmonton-Highlands and Edmonton-Norwood electoral districts. The first election in the district was won by NDP leader Brian Mason who won a landslide with over 60% of the popular vote.

Mason was re-elected in the 2008 general election against former MLA Andrew Beniuk. He won a slightly reduced majority but still won over half the popular vote. In the 2015 election, Mason was re-elected in a landslide, becoming the longest-serving MLA in the NDP government.

Election results

2015 general election

2012 general election

2008 general election

2004 general election

Senate nominee results

2012 Senate nominee election district results

2004 Senate nominee election district results

Voters had the option of selecting 4 Candidates on the Ballot

Student Vote results

2004 election

On November 19, 2004 a Student Vote was conducted at participating Alberta schools to parallel the 2004 Alberta general election results. The vote was designed to educate students and simulate the electoral process for persons who have not yet reached the legal majority. The vote was conducted in 80 of the 83 provincial electoral districts with students voting for actual election candidates. Schools with a large student body that reside in another electoral district had the option to vote for candidates outside of the electoral district then where they were physically located.

References

External links
Electoral Divisions Act 2003
Riding Map for Edmonton Highlands-Norwood
The Legislative Assembly of Alberta
Student Vote Alberta

Alberta provincial electoral districts
Politics of Edmonton